Belgian–Dutch relations refer to interstate relations between Belgium and the Netherlands. It can be seen as one of the closest international relationships in existence, marked by shared history, culture, institutions and language, extensive people-to-people links, aligned security interests, sporting tournaments and vibrant trade and investment cooperation. Both nations are members of the European Union and NATO and, together with Luxembourg, form the Low Countries and the Benelux economic union.

History

Relations were established after Belgium's independence was recognized by the Netherlands in 1839. 

In 1854 Belgian king Leopold I prepared an attack on the Netherlands. His goal was to annex at least the Catholic parts of the Netherlands south of the rivers Meuse and Waal. After receiving no guarantee from French emperor Napoleon III that there would be no action from other European powers, the plan was shelved.

In 1919 the Dutch military command made far-reaching preparations to invade Belgium. It was intended as a preventive attack because of Belgium's designs on Zeelandic Flanders and parts of Dutch Limburg. Brussels sought these territories to be able to better defend the country. After the allies - chiefly Great Britain and France - turned against the Belgian demands the direct military danger disappeared.

Both countries fought on the Allied side in World War II and are founding members of the Benelux, NATO and the EU.

Contemporary
Both nations are great allies with cultural similarities and close cooperation between both governments. The language spoken in Belgium is known as Dutch/Flemish (Nederlands/Vlaams), and is the most-spoken language in both countries. Approximately 35,000 Belgian nationals live in the Netherlands, while there are around 111,000 Dutch nationals in Belgium.

Thanks to their shared history and the Dutch language, the Netherlands and Belgium have strong cultural ties. In 1980, the two countries set up the Dutch Language Union to encourage greater cooperation in the field of Dutch language and literature. The Union offers services including language tools like dictionaries and a language advice service, education in and about Dutch, literature and reading skills, and activities promoting the Dutch language in Europe and the rest of the world. The Union also works to showcase the two countries’ shared cultural heritage.

Many television programmes and series are made mutually between the two countries, such as So You Think You Can Dance, Studio 100 and Benelux' Next Top Model. The two countries were joint hosts of the UEFA Euro 2000 football tournament and unsuccessfully made a bid to host the 2018 World Cup football.

Visits

State visits 
 1938: Visit of King Leopold in Amsterdam.
 1960: Visit of Queen Juliana to Brussels.
 2016: State Visit of King Philippe to King Willem Alexander, the King and Queen were bestowed Knight Grand Cross of the Order of the Netherlands Lion.

Other 
The Duke of Brabant was invited to attend the inauguration of King Willem Alexander and Queen Mathilde is a godmother of Princess Alexia of the Netherlands.

Queen Beatrix attended the state Funerals of King Baudouin and Queen Fabiola. Queen Juliana attended the Wedding of King Baudoin and Queen Fabiola in 1960.

Resident diplomatic missions

 Belgium has an embassy in The Hague.
 The Netherlands has an embassy in Brussels and a consulate-general in Antwerp.

See also
 Benelux
 Belgium–Netherlands border

References

 
Netherlands
Bilateral relations of the Netherlands